Law of the West is a 1949 American Western film directed by Ray Taylor and written by J. Benton Cheney. The film stars Johnny Mack Brown, Max Terhune, Bill Kennedy, Jack Ingram, Riley Hill and Eddie Parker. The film was released on February 20, 1949, by Monogram Pictures.

Plot

Cast          
Johnny Mack Brown as Johnny Mack
Max Terhune as Alibi Jenkins
Bill Kennedy as Dan Nixon 
Jack Ingram as Henry Burke
Riley Hill as Charley Lane
Eddie Parker as Mike 
Marshall Reed as Drago 
Kenne Duncan as Frank Stevens
Gerry Pattison as Tennessee Lane
James Harrison as Sheriff Al Simpson
Bud Osborne as Brooks
Steve Clark as Barry Lane
Bob Woodward as Spence

References

External links
 

1949 films
American Western (genre) films
1949 Western (genre) films
Monogram Pictures films
Films directed by Ray Taylor
American black-and-white films
1940s English-language films
1940s American films